James, Jim, or Jimmy Fleming may refer to:

Sports
 Jim Fleming (footballer, born 1942), footballer for Partick Thistle, Luton Town, Dunfermline Athletic and Hearts
 Jimmy Fleming (footballer, born 1901) (1901–1969), Scottish footballer for Rangers
 Jimmy Fleming (footballer, born 1929), Scottish footballer
 James Fleming (rugby union, born 1987), Scottish rugby union player
 Jim Fleming (rugby union, born 1951), retired Scottish rugby union referee
 Jim Fleming (American football) (born 1959), college football coach

Politics and nobility
 James Fleming (Nova Scotia politician) (1741–1839), farmer, businessman and politician from Nova Scotia
 James Fleming (Ontario politician, Peel) (1839–1902), lawyer and member of the Canadian House of Commons representing Peel
 James Fleming (York West MP) (1939–2023), former broadcaster and member of the Canadian House of Commons representing York West in Toronto, Ontario
 James Fleming, 7th Baron Slane (bef. 1442–1492), member of the Irish Parliament and sheriff of County Meath
 James Fleming, 4th Lord Fleming (c. 1530–1558), Lord Chamberlain of Scotland
 James Ellis Fleming, claimant to title of 20th Baron Slane, fl. 1824–1832

Other
 James Rodger Fleming, historian of science and technology
 James Fleming (author) (born 1944), author of the "Charlie Doig" thrillers
 James Henry Fleming (1872–1940), Canadian ornithologist
 James P. Fleming (born 1943), American military pilot who received the Medal of Honor
 James W. Fleming (1867–1928), American businessman, banker and politician
 James Simpson Fleming (1828–1899), Scottish lawyer and banker
 James Fleming (British Army officer) (1682–1751), British major-general
 James Fleming (priest) (1830–1908), clergyman of the Church of England
 James E. Fleming, American lawyer and professor of law 
 James Fleming (lawyer) (1831–1914), Scottish lawyer